Julian "J-Rock" Williams (born April 5, 1990) is an American professional boxer. He held the WBA (Super), IBF, and IBO light middleweight titles from 2019 to 2020. As of November 2020, Williams is ranked as the world’s fourth best active light middleweight by The Ring magazine, third best by the Transnational Boxing Rankings Board, and fourteenth by BoxRec.

Amateur career
Williams started boxing at the age of 12. He had an amateur record of 77-10. He reached number five in the rankings at national level, although never won a national tournament. Williams' trainer, Stephen Edwards, said that Williams' preparation as an amateur boxer was erratic, so began working on a more rigorous training regime as Williams turned pro.

Professional career
Williams made his professional debut in May 2010, beating Antonio Chaves Fernandez technical knockout (TKO) in the first round. In April 2013, Williams became the second fighter to stop journeyman Dashon Johnson, improving his record to 12–0–1 with a third-round TKO. In his next fight, Williams won a unanimous decision (77-72, 77-72, 77-72) over former world champion Joachim Alcine. Alcine was dropped three times, but he rallied and won the final three rounds, landing significant shots on Williams. The prospect would survive and take the win. Williams next faced fellow prospect Hugo Centeno Jr., but the fight ended in a no contest after an accidental headbutt.

On 10 December 2016, Williams challenged IBF champion Jermall Charlo. Charlo retained his title with a fifth-round stoppage of Williams. Charlo dropped Williams in the second round with a powerful jab. Williams came back and fought a clever fight, making Charlo miss, slipping punches, and landing some good counters. In round five, Charlo landed a right uppercut, dropping Williams hard. Williams got up, however Charlo went for the finish, and got it with a third knockdown after a barrage of punches ending with a left hook. After the referee stopped the fight, Williams went over to congratulate Charlo. Charlo didn't want to embrace and told Williams, “I don’t want your congratulations, I want your apology.” The crowd, noticing the heat between the two corners, started to boo Charlo. In the post fight interview, Charlo stated Williams had disrespected him leading up to the fight.

On 11 May 2019, Williams beat Jarrett Hurd by unanimous decision for the unified light middleweight championship. In an early fight of the year candidate, both fighters went at war, but it was Williams who managed to drop Hurd in the second round, and got the better of him throughout the fight.

In the first time defending his belts, Williams faced Jeison Rosario, who was ranked #5 by the IBF and #9 by the WBA. Williams boxed well in the beginning, but Rosario looked like the bigger man and was holding up well to Williams' attacks. In the fifth round, Rosario dominated Williams, shaking Williams up badly and forcing the referee to stop the fight to get the upset win.

Personal life
Julian was raised in West Philadelphia and is a Muslim.

Professional boxing record

See also
List of light-middleweight boxing champions

References

External links

Julian Williams - Profile, News Archive & Current Rankings at Box.Live

1990 births
Living people
Boxers from Philadelphia
African-American boxers
American male boxers
World light-middleweight boxing champions
World Boxing Association champions
International Boxing Federation champions
International Boxing Organization champions
African-American Muslims
21st-century African-American sportspeople